The People on Market Street is an educational series of seven short films produced in 1977 to illustrate the basic concepts of microeconomics. The series was produced by the Terry Kahn Organization, written by Arla Sorkin and Terry Kahn, Produced by Terry Kahn, Ilene Kahn, and Arla Sorkin, and directed by Terry Kahn.  It is distributed by Walt Disney Educational Media.   The series was produced for the Foundation for Economics and Education at the  University of California, Los Angeles and is a live action series.  The series is unique in that it does not use any charts or diagrams, but rather, human behavior, to illustrate the basic principles of microeconomics.  Each episode was scripted and used Screen Actors Guild actors.

Films

1977 

Cost (September 1977), on the organization of a party
Demand (September 1977), a scene at a petrol
Market Clearing Price (September 1977),
Property Rights and Pollution (September 1977), with the theft of a bicycle
Scarcity and Planning (September 1977), on the visit of a man and a woman in a clinic
Supply (September 1977), with an ant farm to demonstrate the influence of supply
Wages and Production (September 1977), a workshop on school supplies

Disney documentary films
Disney educational films
Disney short film series
1977 films
1970s educational films
1970s American films